Bruce William Watson (born March 11, 1961) is a Canadian-born Scottish guitarist, best known for being a member of Big Country.

Early life and career
Watson was born in Timmins, Ontario, Canada. He moved with his family to Scotland as a toddler.

Prior to joining Big Country, Watson had been a member of several Fife-based new wave bands including the Delinquents and Eurosect.

Role in Big Country
Watson's role in the band was primarily as a supporting guitarist. He typically contributed rhythmic textures ("Wonderland", "Lost Patrol") and repetitive melodic fills ("In a Big Country", "Look Away") which underpinned verses, contrasting with Stuart Adamson's more straightforward chord work in these sections. During solos, as Adamson played the main melody, Watson often contributed a counter-melody. Watson also played slide guitar on some of the band's early material, including "Rain Dance" and "Red Fox." Later on, Adamson played much of the slide guitar work on the band's songs. Watson is also an accomplished mandolin player, and put this skill to use on several of Big Country's more country and western-influenced songs, including "Broken Heart (Thirteen Valleys)".

During recent tours, Watson has played many of Adamson's lead guitar parts live, while his son, Jamie, fulfils his old role.

Watson has played guitar on every Big Country album, and co-wrote many Big Country songs with Adamson. He also sang live backing vocals.

Performances and tours
In the summer of 2007, Watson played with the Skids who had reformed to play two gigs in Dunfermline prior to a set on the main stage at T in the Park.

Also in 2007, to celebrate 25 years of Big Country, he reunited with founding members Tony Butler (now lead vocalist) and Mark Brzezicki to embark on a tour of the UK with dates in Scotland and England. Fellow band co-founder Stuart Adamson died in December 2001.

Starting in 2008, Watson began performing with his son Jamie Watson, as well as releasing an album, The Portastudio Diaries (2009), which chronicled a series of recordings in Bruce Watson's home recording studio.

Bruce and Jamie, along with American musician Tom Kercheval have a side project called WKW.  WKW released an album in 2019 called Men of Steel.

References

External links
Big Country website
Official Casbah Club website
Official website of Bruce and Jamie Watson
The Skids fan website
The Skids official website

1961 births
Living people
Musicians from Timmins
Canadian rock guitarists
Canadian male guitarists
Canadian emigrants to Scotland
Scottish rock guitarists
Scottish male guitarists
Scottish new wave musicians
Big Country members
Skids (band) members
Dead Men Walking members
Casbah Club members